Krasnokamensk is the name of several urban localities in Russia:
Krasnokamensk, Zabaykalsky Krai, a town in Krasnokamensky District of Zabaykalsky Krai
Krasnokamensk, Krasnoyarsk Krai, a work settlement in Kuraginsky District of Krasnoyarsk Krai